North Assam is an administrative division of Assam under the jurisdiction of a Commissioner, who is officially stationed at Tezpur. It consists of the following districts: Udalguri, Darrang, Sonitpur and Biswanath. Shri Rakesh Kumar, IAS is the current Commissioner of this division.

Districts
North Assam district comprises mainly 4 districts, namely Udalguri, Darrang, Sonitpur and Biswanath.
 

# Districts within the Bodoland Territorial Region

Demographics
As per 2011 census, North Assam division has a population of 36,84,298

Languages

 
According to 2011 census, the total number of Assamese speakers in the division were 13,39,782, Bengali speakers were 9,23,791, Boro speakers were 3,89,390, Sadri speakers were 3,14,665, Nepali speakers were 1,83,601 and Hindi speakers were 1,25,908.

See also
Upper Assam Division
Lower Assam Division
Barak Valley Division
Central Assam Division

References

Divisions of Assam